The Robert Smyth Academy is a secondary school in Market Harborough, Leicestershire, England, for 11- to 19-year-olds. It is situated in the north of the town, on Burnmill Road, close to St Luke's Hospital.

History
Around 1570, Robert Smyth, from the town, walked to London. By 1598, he had become comptroller of the City of London. In 1607 he founded Market Harborough Grammar School. The building still exists in the Market Place. For the first 150 years, it was only open to boys who were of the Anglican faith. In 1909, Leicestershire County Council built a new school, called the County Grammar School of Edward VII, on the present location on Burnmill Road. In 1944, the school fees were stopped and it became known as Market Harborough Grammar School. In 1978, it became Robert Smyth School, and in 2011, it became Robert Smyth Academy

It used to be known as Market Harborough Upper School, being one of the few remaining upper schools in England.

With around 117 staff and 1109 pupils, it provides a comprehensive education for pupils from Year 7 and then into Key Stage 4 (KS4), for GCSE and Post-16 (A-levels). It has been awarded both an Investors in People award and an Artsmark Gold award. In 2006 a successful application was put forward for the school to become a dual status technology/arts college. The catchment area of the school covers Market Harborough and the surrounding villages including Kibworth, Fleckney, Great Glen, King's Norton, Foxton, the Langtons, Gumley, Laughton, Clipston and Lubenham.

The school converted to academy status in September 2011.

In September 2017, the Academy became a member of the Tudor Grange Academies Trust (TGAT).  The Academy went from six 50-minute lessons changing to five 60-minute lessons without bells.

Houses and forms
The school consists of four 'houses', Bragg, Logan (formerly Wartnaby), Moseley and Hammond (formerly Pickering). The houses are named after historical figures from the town and are mainly in existence for administrative purposes (main school lessons are timetabled by house group and house assemblies are held weekly) but inter-house sports are also popular activities. Two Year 12 pupils from each house are nominated by staff annually to become school prefects.

Sixth Form
Post-16, or sixth form as it is commonly known, is housed in the 'Sixth Form Centre', a separate building to the lower school, providing a cafeteria, computer suite and quiet work areas. Sixth form lessons are held throughout the school - the Sixth Form Centre has a few classrooms, but the majority of classes are still taught in the main buildings.

Both sixth form and main school pupils have access to the library, which also contains computers. Lower school pupils have a separate canteen.

Facilities
Other notable facilities of the school are the Main Hall - an assembly hall, in which assemblies are held, as well as concerts, proms and other large-scale events. The Max studio allows pupils to take part in activities such as Dance and Drama "The Max", named after governor Maxwell Corney. This has a highly flexible format with space for dancing classes and acting. The Hammond Theatre is also a small intimate space used for small productions and practice performances.   All new floodlit Astro Pitch with 2G Sand Based Astro Pitch for Football and Hockey. Full Hockey Pitch 11 v 11 Football and 7 v 7 Football. Two indoor sports centre halls are adjacent to the Astro pitches  (in which indoor football, netball, basketball and other sports can be played)  There is also a large school field, on which football and rugby are played,  The library offers the usual reference facilities plus a thriving lunch time chess club. The school has a number of IT rooms, all networked with internet access and several science labs.

The Sixteen07 canteen opened on 18 February 2011 for Key Stage 3 & 4 students in years 7 to 11. The £1 million facility was built to replace a Nissen hut style structure and contains a kitchen, dining room and training kitchen. Pupils voted for the name of the canteen, selecting 'Sixteen07' in honour of the school's founding date.

Alumni
 Matthew Cornwell - Northampton Saints player, Ex Exeter player, Ex Leicester Tigers player and England U21 Captain
 Dan Cole (rugby union) - Leicester Tigers player and England Saxon
 Josh Devine - Drummer for One Direction
 Martin Johnson - Former rugby player and former manager of the England rugby union team.
 Josh Knight - footballer for Peterborough United 
 Andy Peake - Former footballer
 Allison Pearson (née Judith Lobbett) - Daily Mail columnist
 Frances Quinn - winner of The Great British Bake Off
 Ben Smith - Leicestershire and Worcestershire county cricketer and batting coach
 Prof Bob White FRS, geophysicist, Professor of Geophysics at the University of Cambridge
Nina Stibbe -Writer of "Love Nina", "Man at the Helm", "Paradice Lodge" "An Almost Perfect Christmas" & "Reasons to be Cheerful"
 Dylan Fletcher (Sailing) - Gold medalist Tokyo Olympics - Sailing - 49ers

Market Harborough Grammar
 Sir William Henry Bragg KBE, Nobel prize-winning physicist and inventor of the X-ray spectrometer
 Prof Dame Rosemary Cramp (1940-7), Professor of Archaeology, University of Durham (1971–90)
 Prof Ann-Louise Kinmonth CBE, Professor of General Practice from 1997–2011 at the University of Cambridge, and Professor of Primary Medical Care from 1992–96 at the University of Southampton
 Sqn Ldr Tony Pickering, Battle of Britain pilot
 Sir Edmund Spriggs FRCP 
 David Wells, Managing Director of the Service Division from 1993–96 at British Gas
 Marshal of the Royal Air Force Sir Keith Williamson (1939–44) Chief of the Air Staff 1982-85

References

External links
 Official School website
 School history

Academies in Leicestershire
Secondary schools in Leicestershire
Market Harborough